James Irwin "Jim, Kid" Mallen (May 25, 1881 – December 17, 1954) was a Canadian professional ice hockey player who was active with several clubs from 1901 to 1914. Amongst the teams Mallen played for were the Calumet Miners, Pittsburgh Lyceum, Pittsburgh Bankers, Toronto Professionals and Galt Professionals.

When with the Galt Professionals Mallen twice was on a team that challenged for the Stanley Cup, in January 1910 and in March 1911, but the Galt team lost both times to the Ottawa Senators.

Jim Mallen was a small player in stature even for his era but stocky built at 5'5" and approximately 165 pounds. He played primarily at the center and rover positions. His younger brother Ken Mallen also played professional ice hockey and was on the 1915 Vancouver Millionaires team that won the Stanley Cup.

Statistics

Statistics from SIHR at sihrhockey.org

References

Notes

1881 births
1954 deaths
Canadian ice hockey centres
Ice hockey people from Ontario
Calumet Miners players
Pittsburgh Bankers players
Pittsburgh Lyceum (ice hockey) players